Frank Edwards may refer to:

Arts and entertainment
Frank Edwards (writer and broadcaster) (1908–1967), American radio writer and broadcaster
Frank Edwards (blues musician) (1909–2002), American blues musician
Frank Edwards (gospel musician) (born 1989), Nigerian gospel musician

Politics
Sir Francis Edwards, 1st Baronet (1852–1927), known as Frank Edwards, British Liberal Party politician
Frank Edwards (Australian politician) (1887–1983), Australian politician
Frank Edwards (Illinois politician) (1950–2020), American politician

Others
Frank Edwards (cricketer) (1885–1970), English cricketer
Frank Edwards (British Army soldier) (1893–1964), British Army soldier
Tenny Edwards (Frank Nutinous Edwards, 1904–1977), American baseball player
Frank Edwards (communist) (1907–1983), Irish teacher and communist

Other uses
Frank G. Edwards House, historic building in San Francisco, California

See also
Francis Edwards (disambiguation)